The 2014–15 A1 Ethniki is the 84th season of the Greek premier Water polo league and the 29th of A1 Ethniki. The winner of the league was Olympiacos, which beat Panathinaikos in the league's playoff's finals. It was the first final of the eternal enemies in Water Polo Championship. The clubs Panionios and Nireas Lamias (withdrawn
shortly before the end of the championship) were relegated to the Greek A2 League.

Team information

The following 12 clubs compete in the A1 Ethniki during the 2014–15 season:

Regular season

Standings

Pld - Played; W - Won; D - Drawn; L - Lost; GF - Goals for; GA - Goals against; Diff - Difference; Pts - Points.

 Nireas Lamias was docked 3 points.

Schedule and results

Playout and 5th place
At the play-out matches Paleo Faliro defeated Panionios. In the matches of ranking for the place 9-10 Chios defeated Faliro. In the matches of ranking for the place 5-6 Ydraikos defeated PAOK.

Championship playoff 
Teams in bold won the playoff series. Numbers to the left of each team indicate the team's original playoff seeding. Numbers to the right indicate the score of each playoff game.

Final
1st leg

2nd leg

3rd leg

Olympiacos won Championship final series 3–0.

Final standings

References

External links
 Greek Water Polo Federaration 

Seasons in Greek water polo competitions
Greece
A1 Ethniki
A1 Ethniki
2014 in water polo
2015 in water polo